
Huachi Lake is a lake in the Beni Department, Bolivia. At an elevation of 173 m, its surface area is 67 km².

Lakes of Beni Department